Hafsia Herzi (born 25 January 1987) is a French actress and film director. She is best known for her debut role in the award-winning Franco-Tunisian feature The Secret of the Grain for which she won the award for most promising actress at the César Awards 2008, and the Marcello Mastroianni award, for best emerging actor/actress at the 64th Venice International Film Festival.

Life
Herzi is of Tunisian descent from her father and Algerian from her mother, and is the youngest of a family of four children (two brothers and a sister, Dalila).  After her parents' divorce, her father remarried in Algeria. Her mother lives in Marseille, where Herzi grew up.

Selected filmography

References

External links

 2009 Interview with Hafsia Herzi at Cineuropa.org
Hafsia Herzi  Shooting Stars profile

1987 births
Living people
People from Manosque
French film actresses
French people of Algerian descent
French people of Tunisian descent
21st-century French actresses
Most Promising Actress César Award winners
Most Promising Actress Lumières Award winners
Marcello Mastroianni Award winners